The 2008–09 IUPUI Jaguars men's basketball team is a National Collegiate Athletic Association Division I college basketball team representing Indiana University-Purdue University Indianapolis.

IUPUI was picked to finish fourth in The Summit League's preseason poll.  was voted to finish first and North Dakota State second. Senior guard Gary Patterson was named to the Preseason All-League Second Team.

Roster
Coaches: Ron Hunter, Todd Howard, Matt Crenshaw, Austin Parkinson

Schedule

References

IUPUI Jaguars
IUPUI Jaguars men's basketball seasons
IUPUI
IUPUI